Jason Boltus (born August 21, 1986) is a professional American football quarterback who is currently a free agent. Boltus was signed as a street free agent by the Hamilton Tiger-Cats of the Canadian Football League in 2009. He played Division III college football for the Hartwick Hawks, where he was also the team's punter.

College career
Boltus attended University at Albany, SUNY after graduation from high school, where he continued his football career. He red-shirted as a true freshman, but transferred to Hartwick College. As a junior in 2007, Boltus won the Melberger Award as the nation's top NCAA Division III player.

Professional career
Prior to the 2009 NFL Draft, Boltus was projected to be undrafted by NFLDraftScout.com. He was rated as the 22nd-best quarterback in the draft.

Boltus retired after the 2016 season. On June 7, 2017, he signed with the Jacksonville Sharks of the National Arena League (NAL). He played in 2 games, starting 1, in 2017, completing 17 of 38 passes for 196 yards, 5 touchdowns and 0 interceptions. He also scored one rushing touchdown. He started the final game of the regular season in order to give starter Damien Fleming some rest before the playoffs.

Coaching career
In 2014, Boltus became the quarterbacks coach at Mount Dora High School in Mount Dora, Florida. In 2015, Boltus became the offensive coordinator and quarterbacks coach at Ocoee High School in Ocoee, Florida. In March 2017, Boltus was named the new head coach at Ocoee High School.

Personal
His younger brother Jeremy, a 2011 United States Military Academy graduate, plays lacrosse for the Denver Outlaws of Major League Lacrosse. He has a twin brother, Jeffrey, who played lacrosse at SUNY Cortland and now coaches football for West Genesee High School in Camillus, New York. He is married to Amanda Barton, a teacher at Sorrento Elementary

References

External links
NFL Draft Combine profile

1986 births
Living people
American football quarterbacks
American football punters
American players of Canadian football
Canadian football quarterbacks
Hartwick Hawks football players
Hamilton Tiger-Cats players
Spokane Shock players
Utah Blaze players
Omaha Nighthawks players
Orlando Predators players
Tampa Bay Storm players
Jacksonville Sharks players
High school football coaches in Florida
Players of American football from New York (state)
People from Baldwinsville, New York